The 2011 USTA Challenger of Oklahoma was a professional tennis tournament played on hard courts. It was the third edition of the tournament which was part of the 2011 ATP Challenger Tour. It took place in Tulsa, United States between 12 and 18 September 2011.

Singles main-draw entrants

Seeds

 1 Rankings are as of August 29, 2011.

Other entrants
The following players received wildcards into the singles main draw:
  Jeff Dadamo
  Michael Shabaz
  John-Patrick Smith
  Jack Sock

The following players received entry from the qualifying draw:
  Andrei Dăescu
  Michael McClune
  Costin Pavăl
  Chris Wettengel

Champions

Singles

 Bobby Reynolds def.  Michael McClune, 6–1, 6–3

Doubles

 David Martin /  Bobby Reynolds def.  Sam Querrey /  Chris Wettengel, 6–4, 6–2

External links
Official Website
ITF Search
ATP official site

USTA Challenger of Oklahoma